Ethel Dunlop Bruce, Viscountess Bruce of Melbourne (née Anderson; 25 May 1879 – 16 March 1967) was the wife of Stanley Bruce, who served as Prime Minister of Australia from 1923 to 1929. She was the first prime minister's wife to live at The Lodge.

Early life
Bruce was one of seven daughters born to Elizabeth and Andrew George Anderson, part of "a large family [...] with pioneer associations with western Victoria". She was of mostly Scottish ancestry, although she had an Irish grandmother. An uncle was Sir Walter Manifold, who served a term as President of the Victorian Legislative Council.

Marriage
 
Bruce first met her future husband while at school; she was three years his senior. On a visit to England in 1912, she became reacquainted with him, and they were married on 12 July 1913 at Sonning-on-Thames, Berkshire. They honeymooned in North America, then lived in London for a period before returning to Australia in 1917 and settling in Melbourne. Bruce was "caring and completely devoted to her husband, and accompanied him on almost all his many journeys". The couple had no children, although Stanley's niece Lindsay often stayed with them.

Public life

Billy Hughes, Stanley Bruce's predecessor in the prime ministership, once told him that "you were the worst prime minister we ever had, but your wife was the best prime minister's wife". She and her husband were the first residents of The Lodge, which was completed in 1927 and intended to be only a temporary residence. Prior to the capital moving from Melbourne to Canberra, they had lived in Pine Hill, a 16-room mansion in Frankston. Bruce was viewed as devoted to her husband's career, but in a way that was "unobtrusive". Although she was involved with charities she generally kept a low profile.

After Stanley Bruce was appointed Australian High Commissioner to the United Kingdom in 1933, he and his wife lived in an official residence in Ennismore Gardens, South Kensington. She was seriously ill during their first years there, and spent time recuperating in France. In 1939, after the outbreak of war, they briefly relocated to a flat in Cranleigh, but soon moved back to South Kensington. Her husband's term as High Commissioner ended in 1945, but he then served a term as chairman of the UN Food and Agriculture Organization until 1951; he was elevated to the peerage of the United Kingdom in 1947. They remained in London in retirement, where they had a relatively small circle of friends, mostly couples with ties to Australia. They enjoyed the theatre and played bridge and golf, and took annual holidays in France, at Le Touquet in the summer and Nice in the winter.

Ethel Bruce was "frail and deaf" by the age of 80, and after a brief illness she died in March 1967 at the age of 87. Her husband viewed her death as "a loss beyond measure" and suffered a period of depression until his own death five months later.

References

1879 births
1967 deaths
Spouses of prime ministers of Australia
People from Melbourne
British viscountesses
Australian people of Scottish descent
Australian people of Irish descent